Grigore Moisil High School is a high school in Timișoara, Romania, founded in 1971. It is named after Romanian mathematician Grigore Moisil (1906–1973). About 1,800 students study in the 58 classrooms and 10 laboratories of the high school.

History 
The school is on the site of what was the Boys' State Primary School no. 6 between 1863 and 1949. In 1902, the building became the property of the City Hall, with a secular board. The language of instruction was Hungarian until 1926 when the Romanian language was introduced, creating a German and a Hungarian section.

The Grigore Moisil High School was established in its current form in 1971. It was one of the first five computer science high schools in Romania, along with those in Bucharest, Cluj-Napoca, Iași and Brașov, all founded in 1971, under the name of "high schools for automatic data processing." The old buildings were demolished in 1970, and a new three-level school was built in their place according to a Swedish-inspired plan presented by architect Nicolae Dâncu; the building was completed in late 1972.

Over time, the high school was equipped with simple electronic equipment such as office computing machines. Until 1978, the high school did not have a computer to use, all the work and training of the students being done on the computer occurred at the Computer Center in the city. During this period it was under the direct coordination of the Central Institute of Informatics (ICI) in Bucharest. After 1985, ICI was disbanded and the high school passed under the coordination of the Institute of Electrotechnical Research and Design (ICPE), which introduced electrical engineering classes and laboratories that functioned until 1989. From 1990 all electrical engineering classes were abolished and returned to computer science classes, and the institution became the Computer Science High School; in 1992, it was given the name of Romanian mathematician Grigore Moisil.

Principals

References 

Schools in Timișoara